Sreelekha Mitra (Bengali: শ্রীলেখা মিত্র) is an Indian actress who is known for her work in Bengali cinema. Winner of a BFJA Award and an Anandalok Award, Mitra is best known for her roles in films such as Hothat Brishti (1998), Kantatar (2006), Aschorjo Prodip (2013), Swade Ahlade (2015), Choukath (2015) and Rainbow Jelly (2018).

Her first acting assignment was Balikar Prem, a Bengali TV series directed by Dulal Lahiri. She rose to prominence for her role as Nabanita in the 1996 Bengali TV series Trishna directed by Anindya Sarkar. After she appeared in a host of films, her breakthrough role came with Basu Chatterjee's Hothat Brishti (1998) which was a major success at the box office. Despite the success of the film, Mitra never attained any significant elevation in her career which she claimed to be an undesirable consequence of Nepotism in Bengali cinema. She was conferred with BFJA Award and Anandalok Award for her role in Bappaditya Bandopadhyay's Kantatar (2006) where she essayed Sudha, an illegal immigrant who moves from one man to another and from one religion to another in quest of love. In 2011, she was awarded the Big Bangla Movie Award in The Best Actress in a Supporting Role category for her role in Mahanagar@Kolkata (2010), by Suman Mukhopadhyay. In 2012, she received the Zee Bangla Gourav Samman in the category of Best Supporting Actress for her role in Uro Chithi (2011). She was nominated for Filmfare Award and Zee Bangla Gourav Samman for her role in Ashchorjyo Prodeep (2013). She was further acclaimed for her role in Raja Dasgupta's Bengali film Choukaath (2016). She made her Bollywood debut in Reema Mukherjee's directorial debut Ardhangini Ek Ardhsatya (2016). Mitra has also an extensive career on television. Her notable telefilms include Dwicharini, Raja Opera, Teen Satyi, Dui Purush, Teen Purush and Ami Shey O Anu, to name a few. Her notable television series include Trishna, Ei To Jiban, Pratibimba, Bhanga Gorar Khela, Probahini Ei Samay and Bandhan, to name few. She was also a judge on the Bengali standup comedy show Mirakkel.

Early life 
Mitra was born in Kolkata. Her father Santosh Mitra was a thespian actor. She passed ICSE from Auxilium Convent School. She completed her graduation at Jaypuriya College, with English literature as her honours subject. She went to pursue masters in English literature at Calcutta University but quit it when she got a job at Taj Hotel, Kolkata.

Career 

Mitra grew her urge to be an actress during her school days. While working at Taj Hotel, Kolkata, she was advised by one of her acquaintances to appear for an audition conducted by Teleframe, the production house of Samaresh Majumdar who had been looking for a fresh face for the female lead of his new Bengali TV series Balikar Prem. She appeared wearing a saree. At first, Dulal Lahiri, the director of the TV series and Majumdar, the producer and screenplay writer were reluctant to cast her since they had been looking for a girl who had to portray a teenager in the TV series. She was finalized after she reappeared wearing a skirt. The TV series was not completed ultimately. Ranjit Mallick portrayed the role of her father in it. She then, started working as an anchor in several programmes aired in Channel 8. During her working schedule in Channel 8, she met Rabiranjan Maitra who helped her bag female leads in two consecutive Odia feature films.

In 1996, she was proposed to play the female lead in the Bengali TV series Trishna. It was directed by Anindya Sarkar. Her role as Nabanita in the TV series earned her popularity. At a fast pace she carried on with prominent roles in Bengali films. Her first film alongside Prosenjit Chatterjee was Samadhan (1997) directed by Swapan Saha. The film also stars Rituparna Sengupta as the ladylove of the character played by Chatterjee. Mitra played the role of the sister of the character played by Chatterjee. She often reminisced that, back in 1990s, she was always told to play the sister to Chatterjee even though she had potential to play the female lead. She bagged the female lead opposite Chatterjee in Sagarbanya (1998). While shooting for the film, she had an accident, for which she had to lose significant roles in several films.  She featured in Basu Chatterjee's Hothat Brishti (1998) where she portrayed Priti. The film came out as a major success at the box office. In her 2020 vlog Let's Expose Face It, she claimed that she never had any significant elevation in her career even after the huge success of Hothat Brishti (1998). She exposed that she had to lose a number of central female roles since she never showed any interest to be the ladylove of Prosenjit Chatterjee who, then had a monopolistic foothold in Bengali film industry. Till 2001, she had to play the second fiddle in the films she was offered. She featured as the female lead opposite Prosenjit Chatterjee in Rabi Kinagi's Annadata (2002).

She garnered wider applause for her role in Pratibimba, a Bengali TV series broadcast on Alpha Bangla between 2002 and 2004. The series was a major commercial success running 700 episodes.

Mitra appeared in a Coca-Cola advertisement with Aamir Khan. She featured in Arghyakamal Mitra's Jonmodin (2005). In 2006, she came to wider attention for her role in Bappaditya Bandopadhyay's much acclaimed film Kantatar, where she essayed the character of Sudha, an illegal immigrant who moves from one man to another and from one religion to another in quest of love. The film earned her the Anandalok Award for Best Actress in 2006 and BFJA Award for Best Actress in 2007. She featured in Manoj Michigan's Bengali drama film Hello Kolkata (2008). She featured as Raka opposite Indraneil Sengupta in Kamaleswar Mukherjee's drama film Uro Chithi (2011). It won critical favour for her performance in Uro Chithi (2011). She was awarded the Zee Bangla Gourav Samman for Best Supporting Actress for her role in the film. She featured as Madhumita Sanyal in Anik Dutta's Bhooter Bhabishyat (2012). In 2014, she was nominated for the Filmfare Award East for Best Supporting Actress for her role in Ashchorjyo Prodeep.

Suman Ghosh approached her to portray the role of Binodini Dasi in his Kadambari (2015). She featured in Arindam Sil's Swade Ahlade (2015). In 2015, she collaborated with Raja Dasgupta in his big screen directorial debut Choukaath, where she essayed the role of Debi who meets an accident, loses her consciousness and is taken to the hospital by an unknown passer-by. When she regains her consciousness, she cannot recall what happened to her after the accident. Later, she discovers that her husband suspects that she was raped after the accident and bears the rapist's child. The film was a critical success. Mitra was well acclaimed for her performance in the film. Anandabajar claimed that her performance in the film was the best one until date. Times of India described her performance as "understated and dignified in her pain".

She accepted the role of Bimala in Reema Mukherjee's directorial debut Ardhangini Ek Ardhsatya (2016) based on Tagore's much celebrated novel Ghare Baire. The film met neither critical nor commercial success. Mitra eschewed the lead in Dupur Thakurpo: Season 2.

Mitra featured as 'Pori pishi' in Rainbow Jelly (2018), a film by Soukarya Ghosal. Her performance in the film won her critical favour. She featured in Anshumaan Banerjee's Baro Second (2020) where she played Srijita alongside Silajit portraying Debanjan, Srijita's husband and the male protagonist.
Her directorial venture is Bitter Half. She will be seen in The Inside Job, a film directed by Shieladitya Moulik. She featured in Nirbhaya.

Sreelekha starred in Aditya Vikram Sengupta's third feature film, Once Upon a Time in Calcutta, as Ela, the protagonist of the film. She plays a bereaved mother who wants a separation from her husband and struggles to have a separate house for herself. To fit in the shoe of the character, Sengupta never approved her to wear any makeup.  The film had its world premiere at the 78th Venice International Film Festival. Mid-Day considered the film one of the 20 best Indian films of 2021. Of her performance in the film, Anupama Chopra writes, "Sreelekha plays Ela without a trace of vanity. Her circumstances might be pathetic but she certainly isn't. Instead, Aditya and Gokhan imbue her life with poetry." For her performance, she got overwhelmingly positive reviews. The role earned her an award in the Best Actress in a Leading Role category at the New York Indian Film Festival, 2022.

Her directorial venture Ebong Chaad won the Best Short Film award at the Colaj Bengaluru Bengali Film Festival, 2022 and She was awarded in the Best Director — Short Film category. Mitra, then, featured in Raaj Mukherjee's Bengali dramafilm Tritiyo Purush (2022).

In media

Let's Expose Face It (2020 vlog) 
On 17 June 2020, Mitra uploaded a vlog Let's Expose Face It on her YouTube channel Aami Sreelekha claiming that she never had a significant elevation in her career even after the remarkable success of Hothat Brishti (1998) since she never reciprocated to the love proposal of Prosenjit Chatterjee who then had a monopolistic foothold in Bengali cinema. She said that Rituparna Sengupta rode the crest of her career so easily as she had a love affair with Chatterjee in the late 1990s. The vlog stirred Media. Chatterjee never responded to her statement. Sengupta opened up that she had not worked with Chatterjee since 2001 until 2015 but had managed to last in the Bengali film industry. In the vlog, she also implicated that Swastika Mukherjee had a smooth career since she always had affairs with various actors and directors.

Binodini controversy 
After Rukmini Maitra's look as Nati Binodini was published, Mitra made a Facebook post interrogating whether the concerned thespian actress was slim. She further added that she would have criticised the casting of the film if Ananya Chatterjee had been cast.

Personal life 
While working in Teen Satyi, a Bengali telefilm for ETV Bangla, she met Siladitya Sanyal who was the assistant director of the telefilm. Sanyal works as a professor in SRFTI. They married on 20 November 2003. They separated in 2013. They have a daughter named Oishi Sanyal born on 7 December 2005.

Her equation with Soukarya Ghosal deteriorated when she was informed by director Aditya Vikram Sengupta that her name was not there in the credit-list of Rainbow Jelly on Netflix.

Awards

References

External links

Living people
20th-century Indian actresses
21st-century Indian actresses
Actresses in Bengali cinema
Indian television actresses
Indian film actresses
Actresses from Kolkata
1974 births
Seth Anandram Jaipuria College alumni
University of Calcutta alumni
Kalakar Awards winners
Bengali television actresses
Bengal Film Journalists' Association Award winners